Pazhampillichal is a village in the High Range district Idukki of Kerala State, India. It is one of the far-flung forest fringe villages in the Munnar/Devikulam Wildlife, deciduous and evergreen forest, connecting from Aarammile (6th Mile) which is in between Adimaly - Neriamangalam on the Munnar – Cochin State Highway.

History

Pazhampillichal village is a migratory habitation only, in strict sagaciousness. In 1972, few families from other early-settled Idukki towns and villages under the leadership of Sri, M.C. Kuttappan, Sri. Mathew, Sri. Maniyanattu Varghese (Kallippara Varghese) and Sri. C. K. Govindhan (They were from VDCL) migrated to the forest, but the state forest officials ousted and dislodged them away. But later in 1974 they came again and settled naming the possession of lands as Pazhampillichal. But they were severely punished by legal authorities against the possession of forest land and many of them were jailed.

The migrant families were mainly from the backward communities like SCs and Cheramar Christian etc. which still continued, but not a PESA or such categorized area, for there are other classes or castes groups also settled in here. Though Pazhampillichal was established earlier than the nearby or neighboring two villages Padikkappu and Mamalakandom, it had no school up to recent years and the Post Office is still Padikkappu only. Since inception notwithstanding the climate, geographical and natural catastrophes, families with oneness and accordance live together here. There is indications vis-à-vis the presence of Early man|early man’s habitations or settlements over the areas through the relics and vestiges found from the location.

The first migrant families including women and children suffered a lot due to many factors like tortures from forest department officials, wild animals (There are still elephants, pigs and other animals often disturb the farmed lands), the occurrences of natural calamities and evacuation etc. Though other villages of the district got title deed (Pattayas) to their procession of lands, Pazhampillichal families still wait for title deed despite the 40 years over living. In the past forty years of history there were two of such incidences of natural landslides with quivers and rumble that devastated the agricultural lands and infrastructure of Pazhampillichal and most pathetically killing 11 precious lives in the year 1997!!

Etymology 

This beautiful nature bound and made location of settlement area gets its name, as many migrant elders conveyed, from the much earlier settled family with name "Pazhampilli". Those settlers were from a Muslim family who took the forest land on lease for cultivation. During their cultivation and staying over the location, in order to have self-protection they happened to shoot an elephant, which died on the field itself. This incident brought them fear that the officials would book case on them and jailed. Driven by the fear they fled the location. Later the name "Pzhampilli" was added "Chaal" and thus came the present name. "Chaal" in Malayalam (Local dialect) means a "trench" or "watercourse" or "gully" etc.

Geography

Pazhampillichal is situated at an altitude of 1696.998 with coordinates of 10.059969"E and 76.833599"N’. It is a hilly aslant location only, the junction or headquarters is located on the center of households which are situated on the north west side of hill starting from Chappath gradually increasing elevation towards upper side of the same hill followed by a road and further goes to Padikkappu. The other sides of the hill are dense forest with animals like elephants, monkeys, kezha etc., tall trees and various flora and fauna too. Beneath of this household situated areas go down to a small stream and from there another mountain starts and its east sides (Facing to the road that goes from Chappath to Padikkappu through the heart of Pazhampillichal)  are also occupied by people and there are households even though less comparatively. The other side of this same hillock is also forest only. Thus Pazhampillichal is a copiously forest-fringe hamlet located between two hills that are being separated by a small stream and thus it looks like valley like arroyo or ravine.

The two hilly mounds situated over east and west with the forests and natural vegetation provide safety, water resources and fecundity for Pazhampillichal and same time pose threats too in rainy seasons. As of or more than other places in Idukki district, the village gets teeming down pour and in winter the village also get cold higher due to the coverage of the forests.

Road connectivity

The village is connected to other areas through one road only that is connected to the road that starts from 6th Mile (Aaram mile) situated on the Cochin-Munnar highway towards North having a distance of 5.00 kilometers. This same road further goes from the locality called Chappath (Which is also a part of Pazhampillichal) towards north east to the only village exists beyond Pazhampillichal in the forest called Mamalakandom at a distance of 7 kilometers and the road goes towards south in height facilitating transportation and connectivity for all the people and ends up at Padikkappu at a distance of 3 kilometers away. The highway is connected to Adimaly, Munnar, Devikulam towards south-west and to Neriamangalam, Muvattupuzha and Ernakulam-Cochin towards north-east crossing the famous and Kerala’s lengthy and biggest river called Periyar at a distance of 12 kilometers.

Distance to nearby villages and towns

Mamalakandam 	– 7 km
Padikkappu	- 3 Mks
Aaram mile (6th)- 5 km
Adimaly		-
Neriamangalam	-
Munnar		-
Kothamangalam	-
Ernakulam	-

Demographics

There are 320 households with a total number of 1552 people. The majority of communities in the village belong to SC and Cheramar Christian with 60% of households and population; Syro-Malabar or RC families are 11%; ST households are 26%. Other communities make up the remaining 3%. Actually Pazhampillichal has many small localities like Chappathu, Kambiline, Kurathikudi, Velliamparakudi, Chupam, Kollamkudi etc. with mostly ST families and population.

Though this is of backward communities and a remote settlement far-flung forest fringe village, Pazhampillichal is having 100% literacy, which other villages may adopt and learn to work out.

Constituency

Pazhampillichal comes under Adimaly Gramapanchayath and Mannamkandom Village of Devikulam Taluk. The Parliament and Legislative Assembly constituency of Pazhampillichal are Idukki and Devikulam respectively. It is the first (1) ward in the Adimaly Gramapanchayath. People of this village in accordance and unity follow and support all major political parties in Kerala.

Educational institutions

Earlier there was any educational institution in Pazhampillichal, which might be of the remoteness, reserve and less population of the village. But now it has a school under state government

Govt. LP School (1st Standard to 4th Standard)

And thereafter children need to go for education to Neriamangalom 15 km away), Eattam mile (8th Mile) (8 km on walking) or to Adimaly (23 km)

Worship and religious institutions

In 1974 onwards Sri, Lukose Mulavathukuzhi works here in the village spreading gospel and conducting bible classes. He was a dedicated evangelist and the first person started prayers and support services in Pazhampillichal. Later in 1976 he established "Vellassery Church" here.

There are Hindu and Christian religious congregations and groups in this village. And Christianity is the major religion in the village and there are no other religious groups or followers.

Christian
There are a number of Christian denominational churches and worship centers existing in Pazhampillichal. They are:

 St. Mary’s Church (BVM Assum)(Under Syro-Malabar or RC Denomination and Kothamangalom Eparchy)
 CMS Church (Under the Church Mission Society, Anglican Episcopal Churches)
 CSI (under Church of South India)
 Marthoma Church
 Jacobite Church
 IPC Prayer Hall (Under the Indian Pentecostal Churches)
 Believers’ Church (Under Believers’ Church, Manjadi, Tiruvalla)
 Seventh-day Adventist (Under Seventh-day Adventists Missions)
 Global Mission Prayer Hall (Under Global Mission Churches Ministry)
 New India Church
 Sharon Fellowship
 Emmanuel Church
 Independent Church

Hindu and related religions

 Prathyaksha Raksha Dhaiva Sabha (Under Poikayil Yohannan’s Movements)
 Devi Temple (Chappathu Vana Durga)

Income and livelihood

The mainstay income of this migratory village is from agriculture only that around 94% of families depend on agriculture for their income and livelihood. There is no other income generation option in this village like enterprises of high levels or micro-cottage industries etc. Though forests are nearby, no NTFP collection or such activities among the villagers.

And the remaining 6% of families depend on agro-labour works. Since many of the agriculture-investment families are of marginal farming cultivators, they go for cutting and loading of paper-raw material "Eeta" in the forest in order to supplement the shrinkages of income and livelihood. Some times this appendage source, available occasionally converts major support to the families.

And there is active participation and implementation of the central Government Scheme facilitated by State Government under 100 days guarantee Pattern; [[|MNREGS]] (Mahatma Gandhi National Rural Employment Guarantee Scheme) in Malayalam equivalent "Thozhilurappu Padhathi". Out of the total population 94% people have such job cards in this village.

Languages
Malayalam, the popular and official governing vernacular language of Kerala is the etymological dialect of the people of Pazhampillichal. There are youngsters who use English and Hindi too.
Few Significant People and Influential Families:

There are few families who supported for the development of Pazhampillichal as of now through their services, education, leadership and inputs too. Some of such families are
Olickal House,
Maniyanattu (Kallippara)
Allunkal,
Panamkunnel,

References

Villages in Idukki district